Rafael Bastos (born 1 January 1985 in Rio de Janeiro) is a Brazilian footballer who plays as an attacking midfielder or a winger for Brazilian League club Jacuipense.

Career

Early career
His previous club is Esporte Clube Bahia in Brazil. He won the league, called the Baiano League in 2007 with Esporte Clube Bahia. In August 2007, he was signed by C.F. Os Belenenses and under contract until 2008 with the Portuguese side.

Braga
On 1 January 2010, Braga have signed the Brazilian attacking midfielder from Japanese club Consadole Sapporo until June 2011. Unfortunately, because of a conflict with the head coach, Rafael played only 8 matches for the team in 2010, even he started as regular in January. In July, Braga agreed with the release of the player. Then, Rafael Bastos signed with the Romanian team CFR Cluj.

CFR Cluj
On 20 September 2012, CFR 1907 Cluj enjoyed a dream start to UEFA Champions League group stage campaign against S.C. Braga, with Rafael Bastos scoring twice against his former club.

Al Nassr
On 22 December 2012, it was announced that Bastos signed a two-and-a-half-year contract worth $800k per year with Al Nassr FC for an undisclosed fee, though media report estimated it to be €2.7 million.

In February 2015, he returned to Brazil signing for Figueirense.

Buriram United
It was announced that Bastos would sign for Thai League club Buriram United on 19 May 2017.

Return to Brazil
Bastos returned to Brazil and joined Brasil on 19 December 2017 for the 2018 season. He struggled in getting playing time during his stint in the club. Subsequently, on 22 May, he switched to Remo.

Mumbai City
On 20 August 2018, Bastos joined Indian Super League franchise Mumbai City FC on a one-year deal.

Club statistics

References

External links
  
  
 Rafael Bastos at LevskiSofia.info
 Rafael Bastos at ZeroZero
 
 
 
 

1985 births
Living people
Footballers from Rio de Janeiro (city)
Brazilian footballers
Brazilian expatriate footballers
Esporte Clube Bahia players
C.F. Os Belenenses players
C.D. Nacional players
Esporte Clube Vitória players
S.C. Braga players
Hokkaido Consadole Sapporo players
CFR Cluj players
Al Nassr FC players
PFC Levski Sofia players
Figueirense FC players
América Futebol Clube (MG) players
Kuwait SC players
Hatta Club players
Rafael Bastos
Clube de Regatas Brasil players
Clube do Remo players
Mumbai City FC players
Esporte Clube Juventude players
Esporte Clube Jacuipense players
Campeonato Brasileiro Série A players
Campeonato Brasileiro Série B players
Campeonato Brasileiro Série C players
Primeira Liga players
J2 League players
Liga I players
Rafael Bastos
Indian Super League players
First Professional Football League (Bulgaria) players
UAE Pro League players
Kuwait Premier League players
Saudi Professional League players
Association football forwards
Brazilian expatriate sportspeople in Portugal
Brazilian expatriate sportspeople in Japan
Brazilian expatriate sportspeople in Romania
Brazilian expatriate sportspeople in Saudi Arabia
Brazilian expatriate sportspeople in Bulgaria
Brazilian expatriate sportspeople in Kuwait
Brazilian expatriate sportspeople in the United Arab Emirates
Brazilian expatriate sportspeople in Thailand
Brazilian expatriate sportspeople in India
Expatriate footballers in Portugal
Expatriate footballers in Japan
Expatriate footballers in Romania
Expatriate footballers in Saudi Arabia
Expatriate footballers in Bulgaria
Expatriate footballers in Kuwait
Expatriate footballers in the United Arab Emirates
Expatriate footballers in Thailand
Expatriate footballers in India